Samuel Kellogg (February 19, 1673 – October 13, 1757) was a member of the Connecticut House of Representatives from Norwalk in the May 1714 session.

He was the son of Daniel Kellogg, the Norwalk settler and Bridget Bouton.

Samuel owned land in what is now New Canaan, including property on Marvin's Ridge, and Clapboard Hill.

In 1703, he was the collector of Norwalk. In 1705 and 1714, he was a selectman.
On June 3, 1723, he was appointed to a committee to seat the new meeting house.

He was eighty-two years old when he married Sarah Lockwood, and she was seventy-seven. The wedding was a notable event.

References 

1673 births
1757 deaths
Burials in Pine Island Cemetery
Connecticut city council members
Members of the Connecticut House of Representatives
Politicians from Norwalk, Connecticut